William Covert Cobblestone Farmhouse, also known as the Covert-Brodie-Pollok House, is a historic home located at Greece, New York. It is a Greek Revival style cobblestone farmhouse built about 1832. It is constructed of medium-sized field cobbles and is one of four surviving cobblestone buildings in Greece.  The property includes a contributing cobblestone well with pump.

It was listed on the National Register of Historic Places in 1995.

References

Houses on the National Register of Historic Places in New York (state)
Cobblestone architecture
Greek Revival houses in New York (state)
Houses completed in 1832
Houses in Monroe County, New York
National Register of Historic Places in Monroe County, New York